Kefi or Kéfi is a surname. Notable people with this name include:
Elina Kefi, Greek beauty contestant, 1991 runner-up for World Miss University
Fadhel Abd Kefi, Tunisian Acting Minister of Finance
, Tunisian Minister of the Environment and of Vocational Training
Frangcyatma Alves Ima Kefi, footballer from East Timor
Kacem Kefi (1945–2018), Tunisian singer and composer
Koroh Kefi, prince of Amarasi in West Timor, ruled before 1832–1853
Mouldi Kefi (born 1946), Minister of Foreign Affairs of Tunisia
Naïma Kefi, first lady of Tunisia
Sonia Kéfi, network scientist and ecologist